Death Ascendant is an adventure for the 2nd edition of the Advanced Dungeons & Dragons fantasy role-playing game.

Plot summary
Death Ascendant takes place in the realm of Darkon, one of the less civilized areas of Ravenloft. The player characters come to Nartok, where public hanging and child-branding have become commonplace, and discover that this place is being torn apart by a secret war between two sets of spies. The characters are warned of their goal using the fortune-telling Vistani Tarroka, and then rumors of war and a new type of zombie drive them to their target location; once there, the characters are left to resolve Nartok's current crisis.

Publication history
Death Ascendant was published by TSR in 1996, and was designed by Lisa Smedman, with cover art by Fred Fields and interior art by John Dollar.

Death Unchained was episode 1 of the Grim Harvest trilogy, and Death Ascendant is episode 2.

Reception
Trenton Webb reviewed Death Ascendant for Arcane magazine, rating it an 8 out of 10 overall. Webb felt that the "wheels-within-wheels" premise of Ravenloft's secret societies is what links Death Unchained to this adventure. While he felt that Death Ascendant could work as a stand-alone feature, "this would be a waste" because the "continuity of the plot makes Ascendant far more satisfying as a sequel". He warns that with "a vast abbey as the central location and a less convincing climax than Unchained, players need to bring recent histories to bear in order to get the most out of Ascendant. If they've fought their way through the first installment they won't care about the slightly silly resolution." Webb concludes the review by saying: "An excellent sequel, Ascendant perfectly continues the events set in motion in Unchained. But they do need to be played in sequence if the full effect of this series is to be enjoyed."

References

Ravenloft adventures
Role-playing game supplements introduced in 1996